Bang Goes the Theory or Bang was a British television science magazine series, co-produced by the BBC and the Open University, that began on 27 July 2009 and ended on 5 May 2014 on BBC One. Originally presented by Liz Bonnin, Jem Stansfield, Dallas Campbell and Yan Wong, the show employed a hands-on approach to test scientific theory and demonstrate how science shapes our world. From series seven, Maggie Philbin replaced Dallas Campbell as a main presenter and Yan Wong no longer appeared and the programme was subsequently cancelled after just two more seasons.

Production

Creation 
The co-production between the BBC and the Open University was announced in June 2009 and was commissioned by Jay Hunt, controller of BBC One, for ten 30 minute episodes. It promises to "put scientific theory to the test" and examine "how science shapes the world around us". During the announcement, Hunt stated that the series "brings popular science back to the very heart of BBC One", referring to the long-running BBC series Tomorrow's World, which ran from 1965 to 2003 and was cancelled following falling ratings. Comparing Bang Goes the Theory to Tomorrow's World, series editor Dermot Caulfield said,

Dr. Stephen Serjeant (Reader in Cosmology at the OU), and Dr Ian Johnston (Lecturer in Engineering for the OU) were the two academic team leaders for the production, covering disciplines including geology, astrophysics, neuropsychology and zoology. The studio elements of the series were initially recorded in a building that housed the supersonic wind tunnel fans at RAE Bedford in Bedfordshire and was also the testing facility for the first prototype Harrier jump jet V/STOL aircraft. They were later recorded in the old linear accelerator building on the University of Sussex campus near Brighton, where Jem Stansfield has his workshop. As of Series 6 (from March 2012) no studio was used and linking sections were filmed on location.

To "inspire the audience to get hands on with science", the series was supported by a number of free events across the country organised by BBC Learning.

Over time, the programme moved from being an educational entertainment format in which short films were interspersed with "street science" demonstrations (mainly presented by Yan Wong) and stunts (mainly presented by Jem Stansfield), to a current affairs-style format. Distinct changes occurred in series 6, when each episode explored a single theme, the studio setting was dropped, several guest presenters appeared over the course of the series (one of whom, Maggie Philbin, subsequently joined the show as a regular presenter), and Jem Stansfield's stunts were phased out, with his attempt to build a pedal-powered flying machine (featured across two episodes) being the last such item to appear.

Presenters 

Bang Goes the Theory was originally presented by Dallas Campbell (series 1–6); Liz Bonnin, a biochemist with a Masters in wild animal conservation; Jem Stansfield, an aeronautical engineer, inventor and designer of museum exhibits; and Yan Wong (co-author of The Ancestor's Tale), an Oxford-educated evolutionary biologist. Both Campbell and Wong left after series 6, and were replaced by Maggie Philbin, a science television presenter. From series 6 onwards, some segments were also fronted by one-off guest presenters. Maggie Philbin initially appeared as a guest presenter in series 6 before becoming a regular.

Live trailer 
Ahead of the start of the series, BBC One aired a live three-minute trailer on 14 July 2009 before EastEnders. Described as a television first and emulating the Honda television advert Cog, it featured a continuing chain of scientific experiments, with one triggering the next and so on. The sequence included Bonnin using a bicycle to power a Van de Graaff generator and Stansfield then using the 250,000 volts generated to, among other things,
 light a Bunsen burner,
 inflate a large inflatable bunny,
 trigger a thermal switch,
 repel Wong away from Campbell along a track (using electromagnets attached to both presenters), and
 power a robotic hand

The sequence did not quite complete as expected: the bunny did not fully inflate and manual intervention was required to break an infrared beam to allow the experiment to continue; the rest of the experiment was executed without problems. Prior to the broadcast, over 10,000 people voted online for Wong to be propelled using magnetic forces. The live BBC 1 trailer was directed by John Rooney.

BBC One ident
From 27 July 2009 until 5 May 2014, Bang Goes The Theory was the only programme on BBC One to have its own ident. It depicted a group of people using bicycles to generate electricity to illuminate a ring of lights, into the centre of which the BBC One logo was superimposed.

Live tour and roadshow 
In 2010, a Bang roadshow happened, and in 2011 a Bang Live toured the UK with an exclusive live show and interactive tent.

Symphony of Bang Goes The Theory 
Musician John Boswell created a song using clips from the Bang Goes The Theory shows and website. It features distortion of the presenters' words using pitch-correction software, over the top of original music, in the same vein as Boswell's Symphony of Science series. Although conceived originally as a web piece, the song is also used at the end of the Bang LIVE roadshows.

Episodes

Series 1 
The first series consisted of ten episodes. At the end of the last episode, it was announced that the programme would return in March 2010. And also with the slogan "Putting science to the test" until Series 3.

Series 2 
The second series consisted of eight episodes, plus another hour-long special, starting on 15 March 2010. It was also broadcast on BBC HD.

Series 3 
The third series consisted of six episodes, starting on 8 September 2010. It was also broadcast on BBC HD.

Series 4 
The fourth series commenced with an hour-long special, starting on 10 March 2011. It was also broadcast on BBC HD, and also with the slogan "Revealing your world with a bang" until Series 5. The slogan "Revealing your world through science" was used on Japan Earthquake special episode.

Series 5 
The fifth series began airing on 15 August 2011 on BBC One and in HD on BBC One HD.

Series 6 
The sixth series began airing on 12 March 2012 on BBC One and in HD on BBC One HD, in England and Scotland. It is shown a day later, on BBC Two in Northern Ireland and Wales.

Series 7 
The seventh series began airing on 4 March 2013 on BBC One and in HD on BBC One HD, in England, at the same time but on BBC Two in Scotland, and a day later on BBC Two in Northern Ireland and Wales.

Series 8 
The eighth and final series began airing on 10 March 2014 on BBC One and in HD on BBC One HD, in England and Scotland. Jem Stansfield did not appear in episodes 4, 6, 7 and 8 but was still credited as "Engineering consultant", and replaced by Sir Terry Wogan, Charlie Dimmock, and Dr. Chris van Tulleken as guest host.

Controversy

Episode on nuclear power found 'misleading' by BBC Trust 
The 8th episode of series 5 looking at nuclear power was found to be 'not accurate' and 'misleading' by the Ethical Standards Committee of the BBC Trust. The review of the episode was prompted by a complaint registered by 50 co-signatories, which included MPs and nuclear experts.

Jem Stansfield wins damages against the BBC 
On 1 October 2021, ex-presenter Jem Stansfield won £1.6m in damages for suffering and loss of earns as a result of injuries he sustained while acting as a "human crash-test" dummy in 2013. The judge commented "I must say that I find it astonishing that anyone thought that this exercise was a sensible idea. On his own account to camera, the claimant was simulating a road traffic collision of the sort that commonly causes injury. It might be thought that someone of his intelligence and scientific background might have appreciated the risk."

DVD releases 
A DVD set containing the first two series of Bang Goes the Theory was issued in 2010. A second DVD set containing Series 3 and 4 of Bang Goes the Theory was issued in November 2011. None of the subsequent series has been issued on DVD.

References

External links 
 
 
 Bang Goes the Theory at OpenLearn

2009 British television series debuts
2014 British television series endings
BBC high definition shows
BBC Television shows
Popular science
Science education television series
Science education in the United Kingdom
English-language television shows